A by-election for the electoral district of Cottesloe in Western Australia took place on 17 March 2018. The by-election was triggered by the resignation of the Liberal Party member, Colin Barnett, on 5 February 2018. Barnett was the Premier of Western Australia from 23 September 2008 until 17 March 2017, when he was succeeded as Premier by Mark McGowan after the Labor Party defeated Barnett's Liberal government at the 2017 state election in March 2017. The by-election was won by the Liberal candidate David Honey.

Dates
The writ for the by-election was issued by the Speaker of the  Legislative Assembly, Peter Watson, on 6 February 2018.

The by-election was held on 17 March 2018, the same day as the South Australian state election and the Batman federal by-election.

Candidates
The Labor Party announced it would not nominate a candidate for the by-election.

Results

See also
List of Western Australian state by-elections
2018 Darling Range state by-election

References

External links
Western Australian Electoral Commission: 2018 Cottesloe By-election

2018 elections in Australia
March 2018 events in Australia
Western Australian state by-elections
2010s in Perth, Western Australia